Douglas Edward Schweitzer (born 1978 or 1979) is a Canadian lawyer and politician who was elected in the 2019 Alberta general election to represent the electoral district of Calgary-Elbow in the 30th Alberta Legislature. He is a member of the United Conservative Party. On April 30, 2019, he was appointed to be the Ministry of Justice and Solicitor General of Alberta in the Executive Council of Alberta, and held that role until August 25, 2020 when he was shuffled to the new ministry of Jobs, Economy and Innovation. After announcing his intention to not run for re-election in May 2023, Schweitzer resigned as Minister of Jobs, Economy and Innovation and announced he would be resigning his seat in the Legislative Assembly of Alberta on August 5, 2022. Schweitzer ran unsuccessfully for the 2017 United Conservative Party leadership election.  He was born in Kelowna, British Columbia. On September 7, 2022, Schweitzer announced he had joined Deloitte as a senior advisor.

Electoral history

References

United Conservative Party MLAs
Living people
People from Kelowna
Politicians from Calgary
1970s births
Members of the Executive Council of Alberta
21st-century Canadian politicians